Víctor is a Spanish masculine given name, equivalent to Victor in English and Vítor in Portuguese. Notable people with the given name include:

Víctor Cabrera (Argentine footballer)
Víctor Cabrera (Chilean footballer)
Víctor Hugo Cabrera, actor
Víctor Manuel Camacho, politician
Víctor Carrillo, football referee
Víctor Hermosillo y Celada, politician
Víctor Raul Díaz Chávez, politician
Víctor Casadesús, footballer
Víctor Emeric, politician
Víctor Espárrago, football coach
Víctor Fernández, football coach
Víctor Manuel García Valdés (1897–1969), Cuban painter
Victor Garcia (director)
Victor G. Garcia III, ambassador
Víctor García (Spanish singer)
Víctor García (Mexican singer)
Víctor Andrés García Belaúnde, politician
Víctor García (racing driver)
Víctor García (volleyball)
Víctor Garcia (Spanish director)
Víctor García (runner)
Víctor Hugo García, footballer
Víctor García Marín, footballer
Víctor Genes, footballer
Víctor Jara, Chilean singer-songwriter and theatre director
Víctor Mancilla, footballer
Víctor Martínez (baseball)
Víctor Martínez (bodybuilder)
Víctor Hipólito Martínez, politician
Victor Martinez (author)
Víctor Mayorga, politician
Víctor Mora (comics)
Víctor Mora (athlete)
Víctor Muñoz, footballer
Víctor Manuel Ortíz, politician
Víctor Pecci, tennis player
Víctor Púa, footballer
Víctor Rivera (football manager)
Víctor Rivera (volleyball)
Víctor Hugo Rivera, football referee
Víctor Rivera (professional wrestler), wrestler
Victor Rivera (bishop)
Víctor Rodríguez (Andorran footballer)
Víctor Rodríguez Andrade, footballer
Víctor Rodríguez Romero, footballer
Víctor Rodríguez (wrestler)
Víctor Rodríguez Núñez, journalist
Víctor Valdés, footballer
Víctor Vassallo, politician

Spanish masculine given names